Culiseta particeps  is a species of mosquito in the family Culicidae.  It is found along the West coast of the United States including Southern California, Arizona as well as Mexico and Guatemala.  Cs. particeps is not a known vector of human pathogens.

References

External links
Culiseta - an overview | ScienceDirect Topics, Science Direct.com, retrieved 8 April 2022
(PDF) The first record of Culiseta particeps (Diptera: Culicidae) in Canada, Researchgate.net, retrieved 8 April 2022
Culiseta particeps, Napamosquito.org, retrieved 8 April 2022

Culicidae
Insects described in 1903